Elections to the French National Assembly were held in the Comoros on 17 June 1951. The territory elected a single seat, won by Saïd Mohamed Cheikh.

Results

References

Comoros
Elections in the Comoros
1951 in the Comoros